Jean-Paul Vandel (born 31 October 1951) is a French cross-country skier. He competed at the 1972 Winter Olympics and the 1976 Winter Olympics.

References

1951 births
Living people
French male cross-country skiers
Olympic cross-country skiers of France
Cross-country skiers at the 1972 Winter Olympics
Cross-country skiers at the 1976 Winter Olympics
Place of birth missing (living people)
20th-century French people